TIV MPI Adventure is a  wind turbine installation vessel that was built in 2010 by Cosco Nantong Shipyard, China.

Description
She has an air draught of  when operating at a  draught. The ship is propelled by three Rolls-Royce US 355 FP azimuth thrusters. She has three bow thrusters. These are powered by six 3,625bhp Rolls-Royce Bergen C25:33L-8 diesel engines.

MPI Adventure has accommodation for 112 crew, with a maximum of 200 people able to be accommodated on board. The ship is fitted with six  jacking legs.

History
MPI Adventure was launched on 27 August 2010. The naming ceremony was held on 19 January 2011 at Qidong, Jiangsu, China. She was delivered to the United Kingdom from China on 21 March 2011. MPI Adventure is flagged to the Netherlands. She is allocated the IMO Number 9530084, the MMSI Number 245924000 and the Call sign PCKV.

MPI Adventure was used to install wind turbines in the London Array.

References

External links
Current location of MPI Adventure
Photograph of MPI Adventure

2010 ships
Ships built in China
Merchant ships of the Netherlands
Wind turbine installation vessels